Danes Island is an island in Norway's Svalbard archipelago in the Arctic Ocean with an area of . It lies just off the northwest coast of Spitsbergen, the largest island in the archipelago, near to Magdalenefjorden. Just to the north lies Amsterdam Island. Most of Svalbard's islands, including Danes Island, are uninhabited; only Spitsbergen, Bjørnøya and Hopen have settlements.

History 

In 1631 the Danish established a permanent station in Robbe Bay (Kobbefjorden), which was abandoned in 1658. Another station was established by the Dutch in Houcker Bay (Virgohamna), on the north side of Danes Island in the 1630s. It was called the "Cookery of Harlingen." The remains of this station were seen by Friderich Martens in 1671.

The island is the location from which S. A. Andrée's Arctic balloon expedition of 1897 started. Andrée's hydrogen balloon crashed on the pack ice three days after its launch from Danes Island, and after wandering and drifting for nearly three months, the explorers finally perished on Kvitøya, also in Svalbard.

Gallery

See also 
List of islands in the Arctic Ocean

Citations

References 
 Lundström, Sven (1997). "Vår position är ej synnerligen god…" Andréexpeditionen i svart och vitt. Borås: Carlssons förlag. (Swedish)

 
Islands of Svalbard
Uninhabited islands of Norway